Onion Creek is a neighborhood in Austin.

Onion Creek is also the name of a creek that starts in Hays County, Texas and empties into the Colorado River (Texas).

Geography
Onion Creek is located at  (30.141145, -97.789188), 10 miles (16 km) south of downtown Austin. In November 2013, AT&T announced that the Onion Creek neighborhood would become one of four Austin neighborhoods to get their new GigaPower high speed internet service.

According to the United States Census Bureau, the CDP has a total area of 3.2 square miles (8.3 km2), all of it land.

Demographics
As of the census of 2000, there were 2,116 people, 1,002 households, and 742 families living in the CDP. The population density was 656.1 people per square mile (253.7/km2). There were 1,038 housing units at an average density of 321.9/sq mi (124.5/km2). The racial makeup of the CDP was 93.10% White, 1.18% African American, 0.28% Native American, 1.13% Asian, 0.05% Pacific Islander, 2.65% from other races, and 1.61% from two or more races. Hispanic or Latino of any race were 9.12% of the population.

There were 1,002 households, out of which 12.6% had children under the age of 18 living with them, 69.5% were married couples living together, 3.6% had a female householder with no husband present, and 25.9% were non-families. 21.9% of all households were made up of individuals, and 11.7% had someone living alone who was 65 years of age or older. The average household size was 2.11 and the average family size was 2.41.

In the CDP, the population was spread out, with 10.0% under the age of 18, 3.4% from 18 to 24, 18.0% from 25 to 44, 40.3% from 45 to 64, and 28.3% who were 65 years of age or older. The median age was 55 years. For every 100 females, there were 89.3 males. For every 100 females age 18 and over, there were 88.1 males.

The median income for a household in the CDP was $87,924, and the median income for a family was $97,151. Males had a median income of $70,260 versus $45,781 for females. The per capita income for the CDP was $54,758. About 1.0% of families and 1.2% of the population were below the poverty line, including none of those under age 18 and 2.1% of those age 65 or over.

References

Former census-designated places in Texas
Neighborhoods in Austin, Texas